The 1999 Rother District Council election took place on 6 May 1999 to elect members of Rother District Council in East Sussex, England. The whole council was up for election and the Conservative Party gained overall control of the council from no overall control.

Background
Before the election both the Conservatives and Liberal Democrats had 16 councillors, while there were 8 independents and 5 from the Labour Party. Among the councillors who stood down at the election were the independent councillors, Clifford Jordan and George Shackleton, from Rye and Liberal Democrat Jill Theis of Crowhurst and Catsfield ward.

The Conservatives won all 3 seats in Bexhill Collington ward without opposition.

Election result

By-elections between 1999 and 2003

Bexhill Central

Bexhill St Mark's
A by-election was held in Bexhill St Marks on 7 June 2001 after the death of Conservative councillor and leader of Rother council Ivor Brampton.

Fairlight
A by-election was held in Fairlight on 1 November 2001 after the Conservative councillor S. Ashworth resigned her seat. It was held for the Conservatives by Roger Bird with a majority of 213 votes.

Old Town

References

1999
1999 English local elections
1990s in East Sussex